Eugenia Maia (born 26 April 1974) is a Brazilian former professional tennis player.

Maia competed on the professional tour in the 1990s and won seven ITF doubles titles.

In both 1996 and 1997 she was a member of the Brazil Fed Cup team, playing singles in a total of five ties.

ITF Circuit finals

Singles: 3 (0–3)

Doubles: 14 (7–7)

References

External links
 
 
 

1974 births
Living people
Brazilian female tennis players
20th-century Brazilian women
21st-century Brazilian women